Oslov is a municipality and village in Písek District in the South Bohemian Region of the Czech Republic. It has about 300 inhabitants.

Administrative parts
The village of Tukleky and the hamlet of Svatá Anna are administrative parts of Oslov.

Notable people
Martin Josef Říha (1839–1907), Bishop of České Budějovice

References

External links

Villages in Písek District